4217 Engelhardt, provisional designation , is a stony Phocean asteroid and a potentially binary system from the inner regions of the asteroid belt, approximately 9 kilometers in diameter. It was discovered on 24 January 1988, by American astronomer Carolyn Shoemaker at Palomar Observatory in California, and later named after German mineralogist Wolf von Engelhardt.

Classification and orbit 

Engelhardt is a stony S-type asteroid and a member of the Phocaea family. It orbits the Sun in the inner main-belt at a distance of 1.8–2.8 AU once every 3 years and 6 months (1,286 days). Its orbit has an eccentricity of 0.21 and an inclination of 23° with respect to the ecliptic.

Physical characteristics

Lightcurves 

In November 2004, a rotational lightcurve of Engelhardt was obtained from photometric observations by American astronomer Brian Warner at this Palmer Divide Observatory in Colorado. Lightcurve analysis gave a well-defined rotation period of 3.066 hours with a brightness amplitude of 0.16 magnitude.

In December 2011, a follow-up observation by Warner gave a period of 3.0661 hours with 0.18 amplitude. Due to a couple of supposed occultation and eclipsing events, Warner also suspects that Engelhardt might by a binary system with a minor-planet moon orbiting it every 36.03 hours. The result, however, is far from conclusive.

Diameter and albedo 

According to the surveys carried out by the Infrared Astronomical Satellite IRAS, the Japanese Akari satellite, and NASA's Wide-field Infrared Survey Explorer with its subsequent NEOWISE mission, Engelhardt measures between 7.34 and 9.16 kilometers in diameter and its surface has an albedo between and 0.231 and 0.37. The Collaborative Asteroid Lightcurve Link derives an albedo of 0.2489 and a diameter of 9.24 kilometers with on an absolute magnitude of 12.3.

Naming 

Baltic German geologist and mineralogist Wolf von Engelhardt (1910–2008), expert on impact craters and related mineral metamorphism. He was a professor at the University of Tübingen and a longtime director of its Institute of Mineralogy and Petrography. The approved naming citation was published by the Minor Planet Center on 27 June 1991.

Notes

References

External links 
 Asteroid Lightcurve Database (LCDB), query form (info )
 Dictionary of Minor Planet Names, Google books
 Asteroids and comets rotation curves, CdR – Observatoire de Genève, Raoul Behrend
 Discovery Circumstances: Numbered Minor Planets (1)-(5000) – Minor Planet Center
 
 

004217
Discoveries by Carolyn S. Shoemaker
Named minor planets
004217
19880124